Hubert Gordon Watts (8 December 1893 – March 1986) was a British racewalker. He competed in the men's 10 kilometres walk at the 1924 Summer Olympics.

References

External links
 

1893 births
1986 deaths
Athletes (track and field) at the 1924 Summer Olympics
British male racewalkers
Olympic athletes of Great Britain
Place of birth missing